Gibbs House is a historic home located at Lockport in Niagara County, New York.  It is a -story stone structure built about 1850 by Phillip J. Gibbs, an early settler of Lockport, in the Greek Revival style. It is one of approximately 75 stone residences remaining in the city of Lockport.

It was listed on the National Register of Historic Places in 2003.

References

External links
Gibbs House - Lockport, NY - U.S. National Register of Historic Places on Waymarking.com

Houses on the National Register of Historic Places in New York (state)
Houses completed in 1850
Greek Revival houses in New York (state)
Houses in Niagara County, New York
National Register of Historic Places in Niagara County, New York